"The Spoils" is a single by British group Massive Attack, released on 29 July 2016. The title song features Mazzy Star singer-songwriter Hope Sandoval, in what is her third collaboration with the band, after "Paradise Circus" from the album Heligoland (2010), and the non-album single "Four Walls" (2011). The b-side, "Come Near Me," features British musician Ghostpoet.

A music video for the second song "Come Near Me", directed by Ed Morris and featuring Kosovan actress Arta Dobroshi, was released the same day as the single. The videoclip for "The Spoils", featuring Cate Blanchett and directed by Australian director John Hillcoat, was released on 9 August 2016.

Track listing

Personnel
Musicians
Grant Marshall – composition, production, programming, recording engineer
Stew Jackson – composition, production, programming, recording engineer, electric and bass guitars, keyboards, synthesizer
Hope Sandoval – lyricist, vocalist (track 1)
Ghostpoet – lyricist, vocalist (track 2)
Elijah Ford – guitar, organ (track 1)
Dan Jones – composition, string arranger and conductor (track 1)
Louis Lewis-Smith – banjo (track 2)
Andy Lowe – double bass (track 1)

Technical
Iván Bello – assistant recording engineer
Bruno Ellingham – mixing
Roberto Morlán Gómez – orchestral recording engineer
Victor Vazquez – assistant recording engineer
Tim Young – mastering engineer

Charts

References

External links
"The Spoils" videoclip on YouTube
"Come Near Me" videoclip on YouTube

Massive Attack songs
2016 singles
2016 songs